The 1979–80 Cheshire County Football League was the 56th in the history of the Cheshire County League, a football competition in England. Teams were divided into two divisions.

Division One

The division featured two new teams, both promoted from last season's Division Two:
 Bootle  (1st)
 Curzon Ashton (2nd)

League table

Division Two

The division featured two new teams, both  relegated from last season's Division One:
 New Brighton (21st)
 Middlewich Athletic (22nd)

League table

References

Cheshire County League